William Gordon Ridley Loughery (1 November 1907 – 1 August 1977) was an Irish academic and cricketer.  He was a scholar in mathematics at Trinity College Dublin, earning his BA there in 1930. From 1930 to 1934 he taught at Campbell College in Belfast.

Cricket career

A right-handed batsman, he played six times for the Ireland cricket team between 1929 and 1933 including two first-class matches against Scotland.

Loughery made his debut for Ireland in July 1929, playing a first-class match against Scotland. He played a match against "The Cataramans" later that month, twice against Sir Julien Cahn's XI in July 1930 and against the MCC in August 1930, before spending three years out of the Irish side. He returned in June 1933, bookending his career with another first-class match against Scotland.

In all matches for Ireland, Loughery scored 134 runs at an average of 12.18, with a top score of 29 against the MCC in August 1930. His top score in his two first-class games was 18 not out. He bowled just nine balls, not taking a wicket, and his bowling style is not known.

References

Irish cricketers
Cricketers from Belfast
Cricketers from Northern Ireland
1907 births
1977 deaths